William Ampulford (died 1435) was an English politician who was MP for Norwich in 1410. He was also town clerk and tax collector of that place.

References

1435 deaths
Members of the Parliament of England for Norwich
English MPs 1410
Clerks
Tax collectors